Qilpenlui, also rendered as Qilpenlu or Qil Penlu or Qil Benlu may refer to:
 Qilpenlui-ye Olya
 Qilpenlui-ye Sofla